Monster High, a fashion doll and media franchise created by Garrett Sander and released by American toy company Mattel on June 11, 2010, features a variety of fictional characters, many of whom are students at the titular high school. The female characters are classified as Ghouls and the male characters are classified as Mansters. The characters are generally the sons and daughters, or related to monsters that have been popularized in fiction. The now-defunct official website identified six of the characters as Original Ghouls. In addition to the listed Ghouls and Mansters, there are other characters who have been introduced in the franchise's related media including the web/video and book series. In 2016, Natali Germanotta, sister of singer Lady Gaga, designed Zomby Gaga for the franchise as a partnership with the Born This Way Foundation.

Main characters

Six of the Monster High characters have been classified as Original Ghouls according to the official website.

Frankie Stein
Frankie Stein (voiced by Kate Higgins from 2010 to 2015 and Cassandra Lee Morris thereafter, iris menas in the 2022 TV series, portrayed by Ceci Balagot in the live-action film) is the daughter of Frankenstein's monster and his bride. She was born in Bavaria, Germany and the story opens with her starting school at Monster High upon turning 15 days old, making her the youngest student there. Frankie is known for her generosity, optimism, and kindness, believing strongly that everyone's flaws make them unique; but also for her naivety and innocence.

Being a Frankenstein's monster herself, Frankie has light green skin and her limbs are stitched together, making them capable of functioning independently even after being detached. While this is useful, her limbs can fly off suddenly when she is tense, scared or angry as well. To function, she is powered by electricity and has to be recharged every night via two bolts at her neck, allowing her to manipulate electricity in self-defense or to power electronics in a pinch.

One of Frankie's most distinguishing characteristics is her heterochromia: her right eye is blue, whilst her left eye is green. She also has white hair with black lightning-bolt-like streaks and her fringe is pulled back and clipped. On school days she typically wears a school uniform coupled with a tie, gingham pattern and monochrome platforms. Her love interest is Neighthan Rot.

In the 2022 reboot, Frankie is the child of mad scientists Dr. and Dr. Stein, created using "the best and brightest minds in monster history". Unlike previous iterations, Frankie is non-binary and uses they/them pronouns. Frankie also has a default cybernetic left leg and several customizable prosthetics that they use in the TV series.

Draculaura
Draculaura (voiced by Debi Derryberry in most projects, Courtney Lin in the 2022 TV series, portrayed by Naya Damasen in the live-action film) is the Romanian daughter of Dracula. Despite being a vampire, she is a vegan who consumes fruits, vegetables and "a lot of iron supplements" instead of blood, fainting at the mere sight or mention of it. Mattel vice-president of design, Kiyomi Haverly, commented on her, saying, "She's a vegan. She's turned off by meat. Girls could really relate to that because that's part of what they're thinking of these days." Initially 1,599 years old, but turns 1,600 in the webisode "Party Planners" and in the 2012 film special, Why Do Ghouls Fall In Love, with Mattel releasing a doll line based around her birthday. In Frights, Camera, Action, Draculaura unlocks her vampire powers and earns the ability to transform into a bat.

Cheerful, bubbly and excitable, Draculaura is one of the friendliest and most popular ghouls in Monster High. She currently dates Clawd, Clawdeen's older brother, and has a pet bat named Count Fabulous. She primarily dresses in pink that complements her pink skin and black pink-streaked hair. On school days, she secures her hair into pigtails and wears a pink zipper top with a ruffled white collar and fishnet fabric sleeves, paired with a white miniskirt and girly pink boots. Due to her birthday being on Valentine's Day, she also has a pink heart-shaped tattoo at the corner of her left eye, and is quite the romantic.

In the first franchise reboot film special; Welcome to Monster High, Draculaura originally lived with her father on a mansion on a hill overlooking Normie Town. Wanting to have friends like her, she talked her father into opening Monster High.

The 2022 reboot portrays Draculaura with Taiwanese-American heritage (Filipino-American in the movie) rather than Romanian, with confirmation that it'll be explored in-depth in the TV series. In the reboot, Draculaura faces pressure to be an excellent student like her father and relatives. She also deals with her secret passion for witchcraft, a practice strictly forbidden in monster world and considered a "filthy human habit".

Clawdeen Wolf
Clawdeen Wolf (voiced by Salli Saffioti in most projects, Gabrielle Neveah Green in the 2022 TV series, portrayed by Miia Harris in the live-action film) is the Brooklyn-accented 15-year-old daughter of a werewolf. She is portrayed as a brown-skinned werewolf with chocolate brown curly hair and pierced ears. Two of her siblings Clawd and Howleen study alongside her at Monster High, and her older sister Clawdia has graduated and become a working adult.

In school, Clawdeen is known for her impeccable sense of fashion, and aspires to become a fashion designer  in Scaris. She primarily dresses in purples and yellows; on school days, she wears a leopard-print top, a leather jacket and a purple miniskirt paired with matching stockings and grey platform boots.

Being a werewolf, she possesses immense strength and speed especially during the full moon, but this also makes her prone to bad moods and fiery tempers. Before the ghoul squad was formed, she was Draculaura's best friend and highly protective of her. She also has a purple pet kitten named Crescent.

In the 2022 reboot, Clawdeen is the Afro-Latina daughter of a werewolf mother and a human father. Before coming to Monster High, she spent her life hiding in the human world and resolved to hide her human side at school after discovering that she turns completely human when nervous or scared. In the TV series, Clawdeen stumbled upon Monster High by accident. Her werewolf form emerged when an Onikuma (mistaken by a real bear by the others at the time) got into Monster High. After both of them were accepted, Headless Headmistress Bloodgood did a DNA test and found that Clawdeen is 50% werewolf. With guidance from her necklace, Clawdeen found a way to change at will at the time when amateur monster hunters nearly stumbled upon Cleo. In "Paw-zzle Pieces", Clawdeen meets her long-lost brother Clawd.

Cleo de Nile
Cleo de Nile (voiced by Salli Saffioti in most projects, Kausar Mohammed in the 2022 TV series, portrayed by Jy Prishkulnik in the live-action film) is the second daughter of an Egyptian mummy named Ramses de Nile. She is Monster High's "queen bee" – the most popular girl in school – as well as the student council president and captain of the Fearleading Squad. Her boyfriend is the popular Deuce Gorgon and they share a close relationship.

Being a mummy who was preserved for many years, her appearance is that of a 16-year-old girl, but she is actually over 3,000 years old. While her profile lists her as being 3,357 years old, previous iterations, as well as the videos, had shown her true age to be 5,842 years old. Cleo is portrayed as an auburn-skinned girl with black hair with gold highlights. Her top and bottoms are the residues of her Egyptian mummy bandages, which she adds style to with glittery blue stripes and bandage ribbons.

Being a member of Egyptian royalty, Cleo is very proud of her heritage, which is displayed in the form of her blue rhinestone tiara and large gold earrings. As a result, she can be somewhat of a diva, priding herself greatly on her popularity, fashion sense, and the many amulets that her family pyramid houses. However, she has great leadership skills and often looks out for her friends. Cleo's catchphrase is: "Oh my Ra!" and her screams can shatter glass.

In the 2022 reboot, Cleo maintains her position as the school's queen bee. Her and Deuce are no longer romantically involved, with the movie specifying that her egocentric behavior led to Deuce breaking up with her. Cleo initially antagonizes Frankie and Clawdeen, but has a change of heart by the film's end.

Ghoulia Yelps
Ghoulia Yelps (vocal effects by Audu Paden in most projects, voiced by Felicia Day in the 2022 TV series, portrayed by Lilah Fitzgerald in the live-action film) is the bespectacled daughter of a zombie couple from Canada. She is Cleo's personal assistant and best friend. The smartest ghoul at Monster High, her personality is that of a shy and bookish girl with a sense of mischief. Due to being a zombie, she can only speak in moans and groans – a physical limitation that all zombies have. She is also the shortest girl at Monster High, but this may be due to the fact that she can never stand up straight.

Ghoulia has a romantic interest in Slo-Moe, a tall male zombie on the chess team. In her free time, she is a hardcore fan of an in-universe comic book series titled "Dead Fast", and enjoys dodgeball. Her favorite color is red and she has a pet baby blue owl named Sir Hoots-a-Lot.

In the 2022 reboot, she no longer limps and can speak. In the 2022 TV series, Ghoulia is the best gamer at Monster High, as well as a skilled skateboarder.

Although introduced as one of the six Original Ghouls, she was no longer listed among them following the 2016 film special, Welcome to Monster High.

Lagoona Blue
Lagoona Blue (voiced by Laura Bailey until 2015, Larissa Gallagher thereafter until 2018, Valeria Rodriquez in the 2022 TV series, Lina Lecompte in the live-action film) is the daughter of the gill-man Wade Blue and a sea nymph. She is portrayed as a blue-skinned monster with golden curls with blue highlights. On school days, she wears a pink halter top, a blue jacket with scale patterns and short pants and heels reminiscent of swimming gear. Like Frankie, Lagoona is known for her kindness, warmth and friendliness that offers the ghouls much reassurance in tense moments.

Due to her childhood in the Great Scarrier Reef and her heritage, she is a skilled swimmer on the Monster High swim team. Despite sharing mutual feelings with another monster, Gillington "Gil" Webber, his parents disapprove of their relationship due to her sea-monster heritage. She turned into a freshwater monster momentarily from Howleen's wish in 13 Wishes.

In the 2022 reboot, Lagoona is a pink-skinned Honduran sea monster described as having grown up in a sunken Castillo with little knowledge of the outside world. Lagoona is fierce and savage, but also sweet and bubbly, she loves romance and telenovelas.

Ghouls

The following characters listed below are referred to as Ghouls according to the official now-defunct/offline Monster High website:

Abbey Bominable
Abbey Bominable (voiced by Erin Fitzgerald from until 2015, Cristina Milizia between 2017 and 2018, Aishwarya Pillai in the 2022 TV series, portrayed by Nasiv Sail in the live-action film) is the Russian-accented daughter of the yeti. She has white hair with blue, pink and purple streaks; and blue skin. She has a baby wooly mammoth named Shiver. She is Ghoulia Yelps' translator. Despite being supposedly Tibetan, she has been Russian since her creation with her cousins having Slavic names, her having a Russian accent, and her mentioning of a celebrity from the mountains named Anton Yaklovitch. 
                                                                                                                  
She is in a relationship with Heath Burns, who she claims "makes her laugh". During the school week, Abbey stays at Headless Headmistress Bloodgood's house. Abbey's fashions always incorporate ice and fur thematics. Abbey has yeti-tusks that pop up from the bottom of her mouth, touching her upper lip. Abbey also displays psychokinetic abilities, or the power to form and manipulate ice, being a yeti monster. Shiver is Abbey's pet baby woolly mammoth, with blue skin and white fur.

In the 2022 reboot, she is Indian-American. In the 2022 TV series, she is apparently from Nepali, as she and her mother speak Nepalese. Abbey grew up alone in Mount Neverest because other monsters were afraid of yetis, but once the Boo Crew met her, they realized yetis are not bad. Abbey is friendly and very clumsy, she was accepted in Monster High after her mother realized the world is not the same as it was in her time.

Amanita Nightshade
Amanita Nightshade (voiced by Heather Moiseve) is a plant monster who was born from the seed of the Corpse Flower, an extremely rare flower which only blooms every 1,300 years. She has purple hair and light green skin. She is very vain, and likes being the center of attention. In the webisode "Bad Tomb-mates", she reveals that she and Cleo were rivals. She blooms once every 1300 years; when she came out, the villagers gifted her to the De Nile family and she became tomb-mates with Cleo. However, she has a habit of "borrowing" people's stuff and later disappearing. Her doll debuted in 2015.

Ari Hauntington
Ari Hauntington (voiced by Jonquil Goode) is the daughter of two ghosts. She has purple hair with pale grey eyes and translucent pale white skin. She dresses in boohemian-style clothing. She is a pop singer, who inspires monsters to be themselves. She speaks with an English accent. She appeared in the 2016 film special, Welcome to Monster High.

Astranova
Astranova (voiced by Erin Fitzgerald and Firoozeh Scoot for singing vocals) is the daughter of the comet aliens, first appearing in the 2015 musical film, Monster High: Boo York, Boo York. She has bluish-purplish skin and blue eyes. Astranova's family's has some sort of connection with Ancient Egypt, which is possibly based on the popular urban myth that aliens helped built the Egyptian pyramids.

Avea Trotter
Avea Trotter (voiced by Haviland Stillwell) is a hybrid monster; her father is a centaur and her mother is a harpy. She has blue hair and eyes, two-toned purple skin, and the body of a horse. She also has black feathered wings that fade to green. For clothing, she wears a top hat, a red jacket with blue ruffled shirt, black belt, and leg warmers. She transferred with other hybrids to Monster High. She first appears in the 2014 film special Freaky Fusion, where she and the other hybrids help Frankie Stein's friends after they were fused together on a return trip from the past. Although she has a body of a horse, she does not like to be ridden like a pony.

Batsy Claro
Batsy Claro (voiced by Cristina Milizia) is the 17-year-old daughter of a white vampire bat. She has light green hair, brown eyes, pale white skin and white wings. Her clothing is mostly green. She loves nature and protecting the environment. She was introduced with the Brand Boo line as an exchange student from Ghosta Shrieka.

Bonita Femur
Bonita Femur (voiced by Geeg Friedman) is a hybrid monster: her father is a mothman, and her mother is a skeleton. She has platinum-blonde hair with pink and black highlights, and pale-pink skin. Her hombre boned wings are upper half pink and lower half black. Her clothes are a moth-inspired print with shredded skirt and arms with pink netting. She wears a yellow netted boots and belt. She enjoys shopping for vintage fashions at the flea market. When she gets nervous, she chews through her own clothes, especially if they are made of wool or silk. She debuted in the 2014 film special, Freaky Fusion.

Catrine DeMew
Catrine DeMew (voiced by Kate Higgins in Scaris: City of Frights, Karen Strassman in Volumes 4 and 5 of the web series) is the daughter of a werecat and originates from Scaris, France. She has purple shoulder-length hair with pink streaks, light blue eyes, pale white skin, and enjoys visual arts such as panting and drawing. She likes to draw sidewalk chalk art. She debuted in doll form at the 2012 San Diego Comic-Con, in the 2013 film special, Scaris: City of Frights, and as a Wal-Mart exclusive in 2013. She is the subject of a Monster High online video game called Catrine Demew Real Makeover, where players can pick her appearance for her Monster High debut.

Catty Noir
Catty Noir (voiced by Missi Hale in the We Are Monster High lyric video, Karen Strassman in Volume 4 and Boo York, Boo York) is the daughter of a werecat. She has magenta hair with a blue streak, pink eyes, and dark skin. She enjoys concerts. In her debut outfit, she has a pink tulle skirt with layers, flounces, and bodice with a spider web design with the number 13. Another outfit has her in a purple and silver dress with silvery shoulders and bodice treatment, blue shoes, a headband with cat ears, silver necklace, and pink fingerless gloves.

She first appears in the 2013 film special 13 Wishes towards its end, but her major full-time appearance is the main/headline character in the 2015 musical film, Monster High: Boo York, Boo York, where her style rivals that of Nefera de Nile.

Casta Fierce
Casta Fierce (voiced by Erin Fitzgerald) is the 19-year-old daughter of Circe and is a witch. She is the lead singer of Casta and the Spells, a pop band that plays live once a year on Halloween. She has long black hair with some orange and purple streaks, green skin, and clothes that have buckles and straps. As a witch, she has to be careful to sing the right lyrics, in case she ends up turning the audience members into animals. Her name is based on Sasha Fierce, an alter-ego of the American singer Beyoncé. Casta Fierce's doll debuted in 2014.

Clawdia Wolf
Clawdia Wolf (voiced by Jonquil Goode) is the daughter of a werewolf. She has mustard yellow hair, light brown eyes, and dark brown skin. She currently lives in Londoom, Fangland, where she studies Dramatic Writing in hopes to make it as a screenwriter in Hauntlywood. She is not very good at sports, and is always studying. She is the older sister of Clawdeen, Clawd and Howleen. Her clothes consist of a gold and black accented dress, a sharp red jacket, red knee highs and studded golden Mary Jane heels. She sometimes wears black-framed glasses. She is a featured character in the 2014 film, Frights, Camera, Action. Her doll was first exhibited at the 2013 San Diego Comic-Con, and released later that year to complement the special.

Dayna Treasura Jones
Dayna Treasura Jones is the daughter of Davy Jones. She has blonde hair and blue eyes. She wears a hat in the shape of an open treasure chest and parrot earrings. Her clothes include a black skirt with gold foil print of treasures that can be reversed to a blue satin skirt that looks like a treasure map. She also wears blue boots that pull off to reveal gold coins. She is featured in the Shriek Wrecked line of Monster High dolls introduced in late 2015 and showcased at Mattel's Toy Fair 2016.

Elissabat

Elissabat (voiced by Karen Strassman) is the Transylvanian-born  daughter of a vampire, who was a childhood friend of Draculaura. She was supposed to become the next Vampire Queen, but found out that Lord Stoker (the vampire who chose her as the next queen) was planning to run the kingdom through her. So with the help of Robecca Steams' father Hexiciah, she escaped to Hauntlywood (not without going to Londoom and New Gorleans first!) and becomes her alter-ego Veronica von Vamp, who is now a famous actress. Her secret is eventually revealed by Draculaura and she becomes Vampire Queen after forcefully retiring Lord Stoker from his position.

She has dark black and purple hair with some red streaks. She is 1601 years old. Her doll was first featured at the 2014 New York Comic-Con, with the characters of Frights, Camera, Action.

Elle Eedee
Elle Eedee (voiced by Laura Bailey) is the daughter of The Robots, and her name is a pun on the acronym "L.E.D." She has multi-colored blue, purple and black hair. Her favorite activity is being a DJ, producing dance music. She first appears in Monster High: Boo York, Boo York. Elle is in need of an upgrade once in a while, even more than Robecca Steam, despite being a younger robot. Elle is working on a pet for herself. She is best friends with Luna Mothews and Mouscedes King, and her favorite food is anything with olive oil.

Gigi Grant
Gigi Grant (voiced by Joni Goode) is the daughter of a genie and is a featured character in 13 Wishes. She has pink hair with some orange streaks in it, and usually styles it in a ponytail.

One of her doll costumes was a colored blue top and black pants with gold detail. She has a pet scorpion named Sultan Sting.

Gilda Goldstag
Gilda Goldstag is the daughter of the Golden Hind. She has short pink hair, large horns, and gold skin. Her clothes consist of a green shirt, brown jacket, red belt, and brown pants. She is a member of the Student Disembody Council, serving as the treasurer.

Gooliope Jellington
Gooliope Jellington (voiced by Julie Maddalena Kliewer) is the creation of an unnamed scientist.

Gooliope's biological parents are unknown (possibly one of them being the Blob), and she was created as experiment #816 in batch #8708, in an unnamed lab by a scientist that signs as R.S. The scientist thought that a lab wasn't the right place to raise a baby, considering that as an experiment, she would be constantly tested on. So Gooliope was left as a baby in a jar at a traveling circus called the Freak du Chic. Adopted by the ringmaster and his wife, she started to grow and grow until she outgrew the jar and was eventually put inside the circus tent, where she grew both in size and in age, cared for by the circus crew. Since then, she has helped on shows and participated in some herself, and is also on a mission to find her heritage. Because she does not know her 'real' family, she gets sad when she witnesses other people having fun with their families and sometimes forgets that her 'real' family is the Freak Du Chic crew, who have always cared for her.
Eventually, she came across Monster High on one of the circus stops and attends as a student when the circus is on break.

She has blonde hair with pink streaks, blue eyes, and pink skin. She is among the tallest ghouls in school, standing at 15 feet tall, and comes from the nomadic Freak du Chic lifestyle where she had worked in the circus and its Scarnivals as the ringmaster. Her outfits consist of a red, yellow, and black dress with circus motifs, a black-and-white belt, and shredded underskirt. She wears a gold calliope headband, and her pink shoes have a carousel styled heel.  She was the featured character in the Freak du Chic webisodes. Her doll was released in 2015 for the Freak du Chic line.

Honey Swamp
Honey Swamp (voiced by Laura Bailey) is the daughter of the Honey Island Swamp monster. She has blue-green curly hair, green eyes, and blue-green skin. Her clothes include a dress with shredded hem and floral print, high scaled shoes, and a small pink hat.
She is from New Goreleans. She aspires to be a cinematographer, and her doll accessories include a video camera and a clapboard. She was announced at the 2013 San Diego Comic-Con, and debuted in the cartoons in Frights, Camera, Action. Honey's doll was designed by Natalie Villegas., and her doll was released in 2014.

Howleen Wolf
Howleen Wolf (voiced by America Young in most episodes of the web series, Lara Jill Miller in some episodes of the web series, Victoria K. Washington in the 2022 series) is the daughter of the werewolf, the little sister of Clawdeen, and the youngest of the Wolf siblings at Monster High. She has pink hair, brown eyes, and wolf fangs. She is the main character in the 2013 film special, 13 Wishes, where she unleashes a genie who grants her 13 wishes to make. The 13 Wishes doll set won a TimeToPlayMag's People Play Award in the category of "Dolls – Fashion" in 2013. Her outfits range from dresses to shirts and skirts.

Ariella Papa wrote in The Huffington Post (now commonly known as simply HuffPost) that "Howleen Wolf is a confident cool character" and when her children had considered putting on makeup to look like the Wolf sisters, it raised some interesting issues regarding whether that was considered blackface. Christopher Moonlight of The Movie Pilot blog wrote about Howleen's significant role as an "insecure and spiteful underdog" in the 2011 TV special, Fright On, where she is convinced by Van Hellscream to join a "Were-Pride" faction that ends up sowing animosity between the werewolves and the vampires.

Howleen was brought back for the 2022 reboot. In the TV series, Howleen is not depicted as the sister of Clawdeen and is a member of Monster High's Werewolf Council alongside Romulus and Barkimedes.

Iris Clops
Iris Clops (voiced by Kate Higgins in the web series episode Fear the Book, Paula Bodin (born Rhodes) in Volumes 4 and 5 of the web series and in the feature-length films, Freaky Fusion in 2014, and Haunted in 2015) is the daughter of the Cyclops. Besides her singular large green eye, she has green hair styled in pigtails and green skin. Her clothing style also has patterns that include eyes in them. She tends to be a bit clumsy due to her lack of depth perception. Her doll was released as part of the I Heart Fashion line.

Isi Dawndancer
Isi Dawndancer is the daughter of a Deer Spirit. She has long blue hair and brown eyes, but has brown deer ears. She wears a headband with antlers. She comes from a line of Boo Hexican Deer Spirits. Her favorite activity is dancing. She dislikes bright lights though.

Jane Boolittle
Jane Boolittle (voiced by Stephanie Sheh) is the daughter of the mad scientist Doctor Boolittle. She grew up talking mainly to animals, and attends Monster High so she can interact more with monster teens like herself. She has black and red streaked hair, although her website profile shows a mix of purple and pink hair, blue eyes, and light purple skin. Her clothes are what she calls "jungle chic": faux fur, animal prints, and feathers. She carries a doctor-inspired purse and a walking stick. She has a light blue pet voodoo sloth named Needles who doubles as a backpack accessory for her doll. Her doll was revealed at the 2013 San Diego Comic-Con, and her first appearance in the web series was in the two-part episode "Boolittle".

Jinafire Long
Jinafire Long (voiced by Stephanie Sheh) is the daughter of a Chinese dragon. She has black hair with green streaks, yellow eyes and skin, and a thin yellow dragon tail. Her clothes include a graphic shirt with electric print and shiny red pants, both of which have black-and-gold trim. She wears red lantern earrings, and jade colored shoes of which the heels are carved with lions. She also carries a school bag in the shape of a Chinese fan. She has appeared in multiple Monster High doll lines, including Scaris: City of Frights, Freak du Chic, Ghouls Getaway, New Scare-mester and Gloom & Bloom Jinafire was inspired by Monster High toy designer Rebecca Shipman's travels throughout Asia, as indicated at their panel in the 2012 San Diego Comic-Con.

Kala Mer'ri

Kala Mer'ri (voiced by Lyndsy Kail) is an Icelandic sea monster ghoul introduced in the 2016 film special. Great Scarrier Reef. She has purple and red hair, blue eyes and pink skin, but most notably she has four arms and tentacles for legs. Her doll glows in the dark with bioluminescent effects. She prefers to keep her heritage a secret.

Kiyomi Haunterly
Kiyomi Haunterly (voiced by Joy Lerner) is a character who debuts in the 2015 film special "Haunted". Kiyomi is the purple-haired daughter of the Noppera-bō (Faceless Ghost). Although Kiyomi has no face, but is able to project a likeness of eyes and a nose to appear more human, and she also has lips and a mouth. Fans have speculated that Kiyomi is named after Mattel's creative director Kiyomi Haverly.

Kjersti Trollsøn

Kjersti Trollsøn is the daughter of a mountain troll. She has pink and blue hair, and wears pink bit-framed glasses, an aqua helmet with horns, a black and pink dress. She enjoys playing video games; her handbag is shaped like a video game console controller. She debuted as part of the Brand-Boo monster line as an exchange student from Goreway.

Lorna McNessie
Lorna McNessie (voiced by Marieve Herington) is the daughter of the Loch Ness Monster. She is an exchange student from the Highlands of Rotland. She has bright orange hair and blue-green skin with webbed hands and a tail. Her clothing includes a red plaid beret, shirt, and tartan skirt. Her favorite activity is photobombing, which literary scholar Aleksandra Mochocka rated as a "certain intertextual playfulness" in character creation by Mattel. In her storyline, she transfers to Monster High to avoid the publicity that came from appearing out of the Loch. She was presented at the San Diego Comic Con in 2014. Graeme Ambrose, of Loch Ness Bid organization praised the concept: "The monster is shrouded in mystery and perhaps slightly scary in a nice way for children and it is therefore of little surprise that Mattel have chosen to introduce this character, daughter of the Loch Ness Monster. ... I am sure that it will have many children begging their parents to take them to Loch Ness which can only be of benefit to the area." Her doll is part of the Monster Exchange line introduced in December 2014.

Luna Mothews
Luna Mothews (voiced by Lauren Weisman) is the daughter of the Mothman, first appearing in Monster High: Boo York, Boo York. She has black hair and yellow skin. She is from Boo Jersey and aspires to work on show-biz especially Bloodway. Her style is described as "goth-moth".

Marisol Coxi
Marisol Coxi (voiced by Cristina Milizia) is the daughter of South American Bigfoot and becomes an exchange student to Monster High from her homeland of Monster Picchu. She is fairly tall and has pink hair, purple skin, and bright green braids. She likes big and loud fashion: her clothing includes a bright orange striped sweater jacket with bigfoot prints, a strapless short dress that is pink on top and black with floral designs and a green skirting at the bottom. She has pink platform shoes to go with her elongated feet. Her doll was part of the Monster Exchange line introduced in December 2014.

Moanica D'Kay
Moanica D'Kay (voiced by Cristina Milizia) is a Latina ghoul the daughter of Zombies. She has purple hair with a yellow streak, green eyes, and a grey body. Her doll was released to go with the Welcome to Monster High reboot film special in 2016, in which she plays its villain who is hoping for a zombie apocalypse where she commands an army of "zomboys". She enters as a rival candidate for student council on the platform that peace can be achieved through coercion. M. Enois Duarte, a DVD reviewer for Hi-Def Digest described her as "a zombie outsider with a chip on her shoulder who speaks from her dead-hearted, prejudiced and undiplomatic gut.". Clothing includes a green and pink ribcage-bone print top; acid denim vest; pink necklaces, belt, and shoes; and a pair of black denim pants with white splotches. Her doll was originally packaged with Draculaura as part of a Monstrous Rivals set.

Mouscedes King
Mouscedes King (voiced by Rachel Staman) is the daughter of the Rat King. She has pink hair and gray skin and mouse ears, as well as ballet shoes.  However, she is lactose intolerant; her favorite food is sharp cheddar cheese made of rice. She first appears in Monster High: Boo York, Boo York.

Nefera de Nile
Nefera de Nile (voiced by Wendee Lee) is the daughter of Ramses de Nile and is Cleo's older sister by three years. She has blue, black and gold streaked hair, and purple eyes, and her clothes resemble Cleo's in their bandaged pattern, hers consisting of a wrap top and wrap skirt. She wears a snake necklace, jeweled earrings and a gold hairpiece as marks of her royal heritage. She has a pet scarab beetle named Azura.

While her and Cleo are both divas in their own right, Nefera is simultaneously cold, selfish, and contemptuous towards most other monsters, and particularly enjoys humiliating her younger sister. In much of the franchise, she thus takes on an antagonistic role and frequently allies with Toralei, Purrsephone, and Meowlody. Nefera's diary reveals that she actually suffers from an inferiority complex so severe that if she feels that someone is insulting her in the slightest, she breaks down and suffers a blackout.

Operetta
Operetta (voiced by Cindy Robinson except in Volume 2 of the webisodes, Gigi Sarroino in other appearances) is the daughter of Phantom of the Opera. She has red hair with purple streaks, purple eyes, and white skin. She describes herself as a high-octane rockabilly. Her clothes include a white jacket with piano key print, denim capris and heeled saddle shoes. She plays a coffin-shaped guitar. She has a pet spider named Memphis "Daddy O" Longlegs. Operetta's doll was designed by Natalie Villegas.

Peri and Pearl Serpentine
Peri and Pearl Serpentine (voiced by Rachel Staman and Cherami Leigh) are the two-headed daughters of the Hydra, first introduced as part of the Great Scarrier Reef TV/film special and doll line. They share the same body, but have two different heads: Peri has dark blue hair while Pearl has platinum blonde hair. They have white arms with webbed hands, a purple and aqua body that ends in a scaly tail, and purple fins that glow in the dark. They love bing and adorn gold jewelry such as a necklace and chain-and-bead belt.

Posea Reef
Posea Reef (voiced by Paula Rhodes) is the daughter of the sea god Poseidon. She tends her father's seascape on the Great Scarrier Reef. Her favorite phrase is to "go with the flow". She has purple hair with multi-colored streaks, greenish-blue eyes, blue skin, webbed hands, and coral-like strands for feet. Her clothing consists of a purple/black top that is printed with sea images and a large purple coral frame on top. Her skirt is aqua blue and is covered with light green seaweed. Her doll glows in the dark.

Purrsephone and Meowlody

Purrsephone and Meowlody (both voiced by America Young in earlier appearances, Cindy Robinson in later appearances) are the twin daughters of the Werecat and are sometimes referred to as the Werecat Sisters. Both have dark gray fur, though Purrsephone's hair is predominantly black with a single white streak with black highlights on it, and Meowlody's hair is predominantly white with a single white strand with black streaks on it. Their clothing consists of striped top, striped skirt, and a red/black vest, and they wear bracelets. Their favorite activity is gymnastics. The sisters' dolls have been released as a 2-pack, and also as a 3-pack with fellow Werecat Toralei as Fearleaders. The profile art was done by Darko Dordevic.

River Styxx
River Styxx (voiced by Ashley Peterson) is the daughter of the Grim Reaper. She dresses in a "pastel goth" fashion. River has purple skin which is transparent on her lower limbs so that her bones are visible. Her hair is blue, pink and purple. She enjoys parties and off pops in to surprise her fellow monsters. She has a pet raven skeleton named Cawtion. She wears a candy coated print, purple chains, and chain-linked boots. She carries a staff instead of a scythe. She was presented by Monster High designer Garrett Sander at the 2014 San Diego Comic-Con.

Robecca Steam
Robecca Steam (voiced by Julie Maddalena Kliewer) is the daughter of British mad scientist Hexicah Steam. She has curly blue and black hair and metallic bronze skin that shows rivets and plates as with a robot. Her style is described as steam punk and cutting edge. Her doll appeared at the 2016 San Diego Comic-Con as a dual-doll package with Hexicah Steam. There, she wears a blue and magenta dress with a gear print, and a blue top hat. She is one of the three main characters along with Rochelle Goyle and Venus McFlytrap in the Ghoulfriends series by Gitty Daneshvari. Robecca is named after her designer Rebecca Shipman.

Rochelle Goyle
Rochelle Goyle  (voiced by Erin Fitzgerald)) is the daughter of the Gargoyles. She has a mix of white, pink, and light blue hair, pink eyes, light grey skin, and wings. She is from Scaris. She can be shy sometimes, but is very protective of her friends, but this can tend to get in the way of friends who don't desire her protection. She enjoys sculpting and is fond of architecture. Her pet is a gargoyle griffin named Roux. Rochelle is one of the three main characters of the Ghoulfriends series by Gitty Daneshvari. She appeared at the 2012 New York City Toy Fair, and again in 2014 for the Zombie Shake line. She was a featured character in the Shriekwrecked film.

Scarah Screams
Scarah Screams (voiced by Erin Fitzgerald in the first appearance, and Paula Bodin (born Rhodes) in later appearances) is the daughter of the Banshee. She has long black hair with greenish-yellow streaks, eyes that have no irises, and likes to wear clothes that have green in them. In the web series, she wears a green dress and a green hairband. She is a bit reserved as whenever she speaks, the other monsters misinterpret it as a bad omen.

Scarah Screams was one of three prototype dolls (alongside Headless Headmistress Bloodgood and Daughter of Arachne) that were featured at the 2011 San Diego Comic-Con. Mattel conducted a poll at the convention as well as online as to which of the three would be made. Scarah Screams won the poll; her official doll was released at San Diego Comic-Con 2012.

Silvi Timberwolf
Silvi Timberwolf is the daughter of a gray werewolf from Scotland. She appears in the movie Electrified.

Sirena Von Boo
Sirena Von Boo (voiced by Paula Bodin (born Rhodes)) is a hybrid monster: her father is a ghost, and her mother is a mermaid. She has purple and blue hair, white pearlescent skin, and silver mermaid tail that is black near the tip. She is sometimes described as an "air fin" (airhead) because she loves to daydream and follow her imagination. She has a drifting personality. She enjoys hunting for treasure in the sea and frequenting antique shops on land. Her Freaky Fusion doll debuted in 2014, where she wears a green one-shoulder top, silver necklace, silver earrings, and black bracelets.

Skelita Calaveras
Skelita Calaveras (voiced by Laura Bailey) is the calaca daughter of Los Eskeletos. She is from Hexico, and speaks Spanish. Her favorite activity is anything having to do with the Dia de los Muertos festival. She has black hair with two streaks, one in red and one in aquamarine. In the 2013 film, Scaris: City of Frights, Skelita and Jinafire Long are opponents to Clawdeen Wolf.

Skelita's doll was designed by Natalie Villegas. She has been a frequently searched item among U.S. states that have a strong Latino presence. A doll version where she is only shown as a skeleton drew criticism from bloggers and media writers about anorexia and body image. Her doll got a new dress in the 2016 film special, Welcome to Monster High. Skelita's Halloween costume was put on hazard warnings in 2013. However, later Halloween costume releases have become popular and mentioned by various media in the U.S. and around the world.

Spectra Vondergeist
Spectra Vondergeist (voiced by Erin Fitzgerald) is the daughter of the Ghosts. She has purple hair, pale white skin, and blue eyes. She floats through walls and floors, capturing information on her coffin-shaped phone, and writing regularly to a "Ghostly Gossip" blog, which often gets entirely the wrong impression from things she overhears and sees. She has a pet ferret named Rhuen. Spectra was designed by Monster High creator, Garrett Sander. Her doll was released in 2011.

Despite not being in the 2016 reboot, she was brought back in the 2022 reboot and was voiced by Valeria Rodriguez.

Toralei Stripe
Toralei (voiced by America Young in most appearances, Alexa Khan in the 2022 TV series) is the 15-years-old daughter of the a werecat, on the first of her nine lives. In most of the Monster High franchise, she takes an antagonistic role as the "mean girl": overconfident, sarcastic and cruel, taking special delight in embarrassing and competing with Cleo. She is portrayed as an orange werecat with black tiger-like stripes on her short red hair, and greenish cat eyes and pierced ears. On school days, she wears a red striped top with a grey jacket and grey tights with little triangles cut out from it. Like her sisters, she wears platforms that resemble sport shoes, although hers are red and not up to her knees.

According to Spectra's investigations, Toralei was an abandoned kitten that subsequently learned to steal and be crafty in order to survive. She was eventually caught and wound up in juvenile detention where she met her twin cat sisters and new gang members Purrsephone and Meowlody. Upon their admission to Monster High, Toralei makes it her goal to rule the school. She has a pet saber-tooth tiger cub named Sweet Fang.

In the 2022 reboot, she is from England (UK). She still takes the antagonistic role, wanting Clawdeen to leave Monster High due to her human blood. Toralei is also manipulative, as she blackmailed Draculaura and Lagoona to do what she says, or else she would expose their biggest secrets to the whole school.

Treesa Thornwillow
Treesa Thornwillow is a plant monster and the sister of Thorna Thornwillow.

Twyla Boogeyman
Twyla Boogeyman (voiced by Jonquil Goode) is the daughter of the Boogey Man. She has purple skin, violet eyes and mint green hair with purple highlights. She is very shy and likes to sleep and hide under people's beds. She likes dark blue and deep purple colors. She debuted in the 2013 film special, 13 Wishes. She was among the 13 Wishes dolls that won the TimeToPlayMag.com People's Play Award for Fashion Dolls / America's Wishlist in 2013.  The doll line to accompany the 2013 film special, "13 Wishes" were also nominated for Toy Industry Association's Girl Toy of the Year in 2014.

Vandala Doubloons
Vandala Doubloons (voiced by Haviland Stillwell) is the daughter of a Pirate Ghost. She has aqua blue and white hair, pink eyes, light aqua skin, and a pink wooden peg leg. She has a pet cuttlefish named Aye. Her dress is sea-foam green with wave patterns and lace. Her debut was in the 2015 film Haunted as a Haunted High student that is rescued from detention, and later transfers to Monster High. Her doll was presented at the 2014 San Diego Comic-Con.

Venus McFlytrap
Venus McFlytrap (voiced by Julie Maddalena) is the fifteen-year-old daughter of a male Plant Monster. She dresses in what she calls "eco punk". She is a strong-advocate for environmental issues and sometimes she blows pollen that persuades monsters to her cause. Her pet is a Venus flytrap named Chewlian. She has green skin, blue eyes with green dots, and a half shaved head with pink hair with green highlights.

Venus is one of the three main characters of the Ghoulfriends series by Gitty Daneshvari.

Viperine Gorgon
Viperine Gorgon (voiced by Yeni Alvarez) is a gorgon daughter of Stheno, whose sister is Medusa. She works as a makeup artist in Hauntlywood and is originally from Barcelgrona. She has pink hair, underneath which is a nest of vipers. She and Deuce Gorgon are cousins. She debuted in the 2014 film Frights, Camera, Action. Viperine's doll was designed by Natalie Villegas, and was released as part of the film's characters.

Wydowna Spider

Wydowna Spider is the daughter of Arachne, a humanoid spider monster. She has bright red hair, dark skin, six arms and multiple red eyes. She is good friends with Ghoulia Yelps and is involved in various creative projects including illustrating and sewing. Although she can multi-task, sometimes it burns her out.  She and Ghoulia have been working on a comic book series called Power Ghouls where she stars as a fictional superhero Webarella. Her debuted in the 2016 film, Monster High: Great Scarrier Reef.

Wydowna was designed by Monster High creator Garrett Sander. She was originally introduced as "Daughter of Arachne" at the 2011 San Diego Comic-Con. She was one of three possible prototypes in which participants can vote on to be made into a doll. She made her official debut in 2013 San Diego Comic-Con with her Webarella costume.

Zomby Gaga

Zomby Gaga was designed by Lady Gaga's sister Natali Germanotta and the doll was released on 2 October 2016 as part of Mattel's partnership with Lady Gaga's Born This Way Foundation. She has pink hair styled in a high ponytail, and wears a black tuxedo and dark sunglasses; her style was based on Lady Gaga's character in the "Born This Way" music video. One of her life goals is to spread love to the world.

Headless Headmistress Bloodgood
Headless Headmistress Bloodgood (voiced by Laura Bailey in most appearances, Debra Wilson in the 2022 TV series, portrayed by Marci T. House in the live-action film) is the daughter of the Headless Horseman and is in charge of the students at Monster High where she also teaches Trigular Calcometry 101. She is the daughter of the Headless Horseman. Like her name implies, she can take off her head whenever it pleases her. She rides her horse Nightmare throughout the school halls and uses horse analogies when she feels it is appropriate. Bloodgood is a good friend of Abbey Bominable's parents and lets Abbey stay at her home during the school week. Despite her being American, she speaks with a British accent.

In the 2022 reboot, she is African-American.

Mansters

The following male characters in Monster High are referred to as Mansters:

Clawd Wolf
Clawd Wolf (voiced by Ogie Banks, Yuri Lowenthal in the webisode "Fur Will Fly", Marcus Griffin in the film specials "13 Wishes" in 2013 and "Frights, Camera, Action" in 2014, Jonathan Melo in the 2022 TV series) is the son of a werewolf who is also the seventeen-year-old brother of Clawdeen, Howleen, and Clawdia. According to "Bat Dialing Disaster", he has already had his birthday, which must officially make him eighteen years old. He is the oldest child still living in his parents' house. He dated Cleo prior to Frankie attending Monster High in the dolls' diaries when he was struck by one of C.A. Cupid's arrows. Eventually, the magic wore off and he broke up with Cleo who began dating Deuce the next day. Clawd is the Big Monster on Campus and plays on the casketball team with Deuce. He owns a pet gargoyle bulldog named Rockseena. He is also overprotective of his sisters Clawdeen and Howleen according to "Fright On!".

Despite being long-time friends since younger youth, he finally falls for Draculaura in Volume 2 and she did likewise, but originally. Clawd has dark brown fur and bright yellow eyes.

In the 2022 TV series, Clawd is Clawdeen's long-lost brother. He was born while his mother was trapped in Beheme where time flows differently resulting in him being older than Clawdeen. After Clawdeen released him and a world destroyer creature called "Splitsee", the two worked together to stop the Splitsee and bonded.

Deuce Gorgon
Deuce Gorgon (voiced by Yuri Lowenthal in the first two volumes of the web series, Cam Clarke for the first half of Volume 3, Evan Smith for the other half and continuing to Volumes 4 and 5, Tony Revolori in the 2022 TV series, portrayed by Case Walker in the live-action film) is the son of the gorgon Medusa. Like his mother, he has snakes for hair, which he styles in a "snake-hawk". He is 16 years old and hopes to get his driver's license soon. He is a member of the casketball team. He also loves to cook and is quite a skilled chef, but he is too self-conscious to showcase his culinary ability to anyone. Deuce inherited his mother's ability to turn people into stone, though he has been able to control the effect so that it lasts for only about twenty-four hours. His petrifying stare does not work on gargoyles which he learns by bumping into Rochelle Goyle. He takes off his sunglasses only when he talks to her. In "Hiss-teria", he reveals that he accidentally petrified his first pet (a dragon named Smokey) when he was a young boy and the effect has lingered to the present day. Deuce is dating Cleo, who seems to always find new ways for him to spend all his money on her. Despite that, Deuce genuinely loves Cleo and wrote a song to express his feelings for her. His pet is a two-tailed rat which he named Perseus after Perseus who Medusa clashed with in her past. Understandably, Medusa is not amused. His favorite color is neon green, which neon green is the color of his hair and Neon Green eyes. His favorite food is "Greek Fusion" (his own creation). Deuce's first name is clearly, obviously named after part of Medusa's name by Sander, the "dus" part, such as "Meh-DEUCE-uh".

In the 2022 reboot he now has 2 moms with Medusa and Lyra. Unlike his previous incarnations, this version of Deuce broke up his relationship with Cleo de Nile due to her egocentric behavior. In addition, he is Clawdeen Wolf's love interest and wears a hat to hid the snakes on his head.

Finnegan Wake
Finnegan Wake is a merman who is the son of a mermaid. He is shown to be wheelchair bound on land which leads the ghouls to underestimate his abilities. Finnegan is shown to be a daredevil and thrill seeker who doesn't let his disability get in the way of what he wants to do. He was originally referred to as Rider in the webisode, which may be a nickname. He was originally called "Ryder" or "Rider".

He was brought back for the 2022 reboot and is voiced by Cole Massie in the animated series.

Garrott DuRoque
Garrott DuRoque (voiced by Evan Smith) is a French gargoyle from Scaris, France and son of a Gargoyle who is Rochelle Goyle's boyfriend. He now comes in a doll two-pack with Rochelle. His flowers are his "pets" and he is a perfectionist.

Gillington "Gil" Webber
Gillington "Gil" Webber (voiced by Yuri Lowenthal in the first two volumes of the web series, Evan Smith in later volumes and the films from Fright On! onwards) is the son of two freshwater-river monsters and is Lagoona Blue's boyfriend. He was first introduced in the webisode "Blue Lagoona" and has made recurring appearances since. Gil is one of the top members on the swim team alongside Lagoona. When on land, Gil has to wear a water-filled helmet over his head in order to breathe, though "Hatch Me if You Can" and the Gloom Beach arc shows that he can be on land for a short period of time without it. Gil is from freshwater, which is why it is hard for him and Lagoona (who can survive in saltwater) to be together.

Heath Burns
Heath Burns (voiced by Yuri Lowenthal in the first volume of the web series, Cam Clarke from the 2nd volume onwards, Alexander Polinsky in the 2022 TV series, portrayed by Justin Derickson in the live-action film) is the teenage son of two Fire Elementals. In the Polish-dubbed web series, his name is Ross Burla and in the French-dubbed he is named Thomas Cramé. Heath was first seen as a background character in the episode "Substitute Creature". In the episode, "The Hot Boy", he was shown to be Draculaura's short-lived crush. In "Fear Pressure", he mentions that Jackson is his human cousin, a possible reference to when many fans confused Heath Burns for Holt Hyde. Heath's first mention in the dolls' continuity is in Abbey's diary where he is constantly hitting on her with corny one-liners. Heath primarily serves as the comedy relief, being the butt of many physical jokes and the class clown. He and Abbey are now dating. He thinks she's "hot" and she likes that he "makes her laugh". He often calls Abbey "baby" which she corrects him over constantly, telling him her name is Abbey not Baby. In the first novel, Heath appears to be a normie (human). In Book 2, "The Ghoul Next Door", this Heath is revealed to be a RAD (monster) when he sneezes fire. He explains that his ability appeared when he turned fifteen. Starting out as gassy outbursts, Heath's ability is still dangerous. Heath has yellow skin, red eyes and orange hair that bursts into flame when he's excited. He's shown as being close friends with Manny Taur, the two are often seen hanging out together.

In the 2022 reboot, he is now the son of Hades and a Fire Elemental.

Invisi Billy
Invisi Billy (voiced by Evan Smith) is the son of the Invisible Man. Invisi Billy can be seen as a bit of a prankster, but he can be kind and sweet, as in helping Rochelle Goyle with her dance in "Fright Dance". He loves drama, particularly special effects which are his forte. His girlfriend is Scarah Screams (who is also his BFF) as they got together in the webisode "Scarah-Voyant" thanks to Frankie. Catty Noir is also Invisi Billy's BFF. Invisi Billy first appeared as an April Fool's joke on Facebook, picturing an empty box with the blurb "How do you know I'm not in the box?" Since then, his character and design have been refined and changed. His doll has very pale blue/grey skin that fades to transparent blue are his feet. He has dark blue hair and grey eyes. His ears are both gauged, making him the first Monster High boy to have both ears pierced.

Jackson Jekyll / Holt Hyde

Jackson Jekyll (voiced by Cindy Robinson) is a normie boy at Monster High, and enjoys sports (particularly casketball) and video games. Jackson is the son of "Dr. Jekyll", though it's unclear if this is his father, though in the books, Dr. Jekyll is his mother, Sydney Jekyll. His diary implies the original Dr. Jekyll and Mr. Hyde were his grandfather and his mother seems to possess the ability to shift. In the web series, Jackson is related to Heath Burns (they are cousins) but through which parent hasn't been clearly explained. Jackson is depicted as a major nerd in the webisodes and specials, though he seems to possess a wicked sense of humor ("Oh I fit in...  my locker, trash cans... you'd be surprised what those guys fit me into"). He is first mentioned in Draculaura's diary where he unsettles her father by telling him he needs to "drive a stake into something". Jackson has black hair with blond or yellow streaks. His eyes are blue. He wears glasses, has one eyebrow pierced and has a Yin Yang symbol tattooed between his shoulder-blades.

Holt Hyde (also voiced by Cindy Robinson) is the alter-ego version of Jackson Jekyll and the son of Mr. and Mrs. Hyde, who Jackson turns into when loud music plays (when he sweats in the Lisi Harrison novels). Originally in the diaries, it was the sun setting that triggered Jackson's transformation into his alter ego. His diary explains that the trigger is likely to change several times as he ages before finally settling. Holt on the other hand seems to be more fire elemental than normie. His skin is bright blue, his eyes are red and he has fiery-colored hair. He's depicted in the webisodes and specials as rather excitable and loud. He loves to DJ and is friends with Operetta. They tried to date once, but Holt's hot temper spoiled things. In the prom website event called "A Night in Scare-adise" on Monsterhigh.com he and Operetta attended prom together. Operetta was quoted as saying he "rocks my l'il ol' face off." Holt is often shown as a DJ at school dance events. He annotated Jackson's diary with sarcastic remarks. Like Jackson, Holt has a Yin Yang tattoo on his back and a pierced eyebrow. (His Swim Class doll is missing this detail however). In the books, his name is DJ Hyde.

Jackson and Holt share a pet Chameleon named Crossfade.

Manny Taur 
Manny Taur (voiced by Audu Paden in most projects, Jordan Coleman in the 2022 TV series) is the son of the Minotaur. He is a half-bull half-human in appearance, he has blonde hair, a ring on his nose and wears a red shirt with a labyrinth printed on it, along with jeans pants and brown shoes. Manny initially debuted as a school bully in Monster High, usually picking up Jackson Jekyll, as shown in "Miss Infearmation". He also had a dislike for zombies, due to them being slow. In "Manny Taur's SDCCI diary", it is revealed Manny himself was bullied in middle school. After an encounter with Abbey, he changed his ways, although he stopped bullying people, he can be still gruff to others. His personality's change helped him get into a relationship with Iris Clops.

In the 2022 reboot, Manny is a calm and gentle monster, he loves to read and is great at solving puzzles. He and Draculaura are rivals in competition of top student.

Neighthan Rot
Neighthan Rot (voiced by Josey Montana McCoy) is one of the new "hybrid" students of Monster High. He is the son of a zombie (father) and a unicorn (mother). He has long black hair with blue, yellow, and red highlights in a ponytail, and he wears a colorful shirt and pants whose color splash patterns seem remincient of anatomical models. Neighthan is somewhat clumsy, but he is a social monster who loves hanging out with his beast friends. He doesn't like monsters judging other monsters based on their appearances. He has the ability to heal thanks to his unicorn horn. He makes his first webisode appearance in "Graveyard Grates". He looks a little less like a unicorn because he only has a tail, a horn, and rainbow hair. From his zombie side, he has grey zombie-skin, and a marking on the left side of his face around his eye. Neighthan has human legs and feet instead of horse-like legs and hooves. He has a blue unicorn-horn, and wears a ponytail with a strand of hair coming down the left side of his face. He also wears a T-shirt with a rib cage on it and difficult multi-colors. He has romantic feelings for Frankie Stein, which seems to be mutual. Neightan was designed by Garrett Sander.

Porter Geiss
Porter Geiss (nicknamed Paintergeist) (voiced by Todd Haberkorn) is a character in Monster High who debuted in the TV/film special "Haunted". He is the son of the Poltergeist and is an expert artist where he often gets in trouble with Haunted High's Hall Moanitors. Porter falls in love with Spectra Vondergeist in "Haunted," but decides to continue attending Haunted High instead.

Sloman "Slo-Mo" Mortovitch
Sloman "Slo-Mo" Mortovitch (vocal effects provided by Audu Paden) is a zombie who was originally addressed as Moe "Slow Moe" Deadovitch instead throughout the series, before any dolls were released and before it was officially addressed on Monster High's website in the description of "Flowers for Slo Moe". He is Ghoulia's official boyfriend.

Other characters

Main characters from affiliated book series
The following characters are exclusive to the book adaptions of this franchise:

Melody Carver
Melody Carver is the co-protagonist of the Monster High novels by Lisi Harrison. She and her family are from Beverly Hills and moved to Salem, Oregon to help with Melody's asthma. Melody has just recovered from rhinoplasty that was meant to help her with her breathing, but is implied to have been mostly to please her parents' family image. Melody's family is neighbors with Jackson Jekyll, whom Melody eventually dates. Melody is the one who reveals the truth behind Jackson's blackouts through a recording on her iPhone. Unfortunately, she forgets to delete it and it gets in the hands of Bekka Madden, a RAD hater and primary antagonist of the series. This video leads to the RADs community becoming exposed, Melody forming the NUDIs (Normies Uncool with Discriminating Idiots), and a documentary on their secret lives. At the end of the second novel, Melody learns from Manu, Cleo's father's aide, that she might be the daughter of Marina, a siren. This is confirmed at the end of the third novel. Melody develops the ability to persuade people to do whatever she asks with her voice. She also grows olive and blue feathers with gold tips. This inspires her to make a dress and jewelry out of them.

Appearing in the live-action film

Notes

References

 Book references

External links
  (Archived)
 

 
Lists of fictional characters